The Pursuit of Happyness is a 2006 American biographical drama film directed by Gabriele Muccino and starring Will Smith as Chris Gardner, a homeless salesman. Smith's son Jaden Smith co-stars, making his film debut as Gardner's son, Christopher Jr. The screenplay by Steven Conrad is based on the best-selling 2006 memoir of the same name written by Gardner with Quincy Troupe. It is based on Gardner's nearly one-year struggle being homeless. The unusual spelling of the film's title comes from a mural that Gardner sees on the wall outside the daycare facility his son attended. The movie is set in San Francisco in 1981.

The film was released on December 15, 2006, by Columbia Pictures, and received moderately positive reviews, with Smith’s performance and the emotional weight of the story garnering universal acclaim. Smith was nominated for an Oscar and a Golden Globe for Best Actor.

Plot 

In 1981, San Francisco salesman Chris Gardner invests his entire life savings in portable bone-density scanners, which he demonstrates to doctors and pitches as a handy improvement over standard X-rays. The scanners play a vital role in Chris's life. While he is able to sell most of them, the time lag between the sales and his growing financial demands enrage his wife, Linda, who works as a hotel maid. The economic instability increasingly erodes their marriage, despite caring for Christopher Jr., their soon-to-be five-year-old son.

While Chris is trying to sell one of the scanners, he meets Jay Twistle, a lead manager and partner for Dean Witter Reynolds, and impresses him by solving a Rubik's Cube during a taxi ride. After Jay leaves, Chris lacks the money to pay the fare and chooses to run instead, causing the driver to angrily chase him into a BART station. Chris boards a train but loses one of his scanners in the process. His new relationship with Jay earns him the chance to become an intern stockbroker. 

The day before the interview, Chris grudgingly agrees to paint his apartment to postpone being evicted due to his difficulty in paying the rent. While painting, Chris is greeted by two police officers at his doorstep, who take him to the station, stating he has to pay for the numerous parking tickets he has accumulated. As part of the sanction, Chris is ordered to spend the night in jail instead, complicating his schedule for the interview the following day. Chris arrives at Dean Witter's office on time, albeit still in his shabby clothes. Despite his appearance, he still manages to impresses the interviewers and lands a six-month unpaid internship. He would be amongst 20 interns competing for a paid position as a stockbroker.

Chris's unpaid internship does not please Linda, who eventually leaves for New York, because she might earn a job at her sister's boyfriend's new restaurant. After Chris bluntly tells her that she is incapable of being a single parent, she agrees that Christopher will remain with Chris. Chris is further set back when the IRS garnishes his bank account for unpaid income taxes, and he and Chris Jr. are evicted. 

Chris ends up with less than $25, resulting in them being homeless, and they are forced at one point to stay in a restroom at a BART station. Other days, he and Christopher spend nights at a homeless shelter, in BART, or, if he manages to procure sufficient cash, at a hotel. Later, Gardner finds the bone scanner that he lost in the BART station earlier and, after repairing it, sells it to a physician, thus completing all sales of his scanners.

Disadvantaged by his limited work hours and knowing that maximizing his client contacts and profits is the only way to earn the broker position, Chris develops several ways to make phone sales calls more efficiently, including reaching out to potential high-value customers and defying protocol. One sympathetic prospect, Walter Ribbon, a top-level pension fund manager, even takes Chris, Christopher, and his son to a San Francisco 49ers game where he befriends some of Walter's friends who are also potential clients. Regardless of his challenges, he never reveals his lowly circumstances to his colleagues, even going so far as to lend one of his bosses, Mr. Frohm, five dollars for cab fare, a sum he cannot afford. Chris also studies for and aces the stockbroker license exam.

As Chris concludes his last day of internship, he is summoned to a meeting with the partners. Mr. Frohm notes he is wearing a new shirt, to which Chris explains he thought it appropriate to dress for the occasion on his last day. Mr. Frohm smiles and says he should wear another one tomorrow, letting him know he has won the coveted full-time position and reimburses him for the previous cab ride. Fighting back tears, Chris shakes hands with the partners, then rushes to his son's daycare to embrace Christopher. They walk down a street, joking with each other (and are passed by the real Chris Gardner, in a business suit). 

An epilogue reveals that Gardner went on to form his own multimillion-dollar brokerage firm.

Cast 

 Will Smith as Chris Gardner
 Jaden Smith (credited as Jaden Christopher Syre Smith) as Christopher Gardner, Jr.
 Thandiwe Newton (credited as Thandie Newton) as Linda Gardner
 Brian Howe as Jay Twistle
 Dan Castellaneta as Alan Frakesh
 James Karen as Martin Frohm
 Kurt Fuller as Walter Ribbon
 Takayo Fischer as Mrs. Chu
 Mark Christopher Lawrence as Wayne
 Chris Gardner as Walking Man in Business Suit (uncredited)

Production

Development 
Chris Gardner realized his story had Hollywood potential after an overwhelming national response to an interview he did with 20/20 in January 2003. He published his autobiography on May 23, 2006, and later became an associate producer for the film. 

The film took some liberties with Gardner's true-life story. Certain details and events that actually took place over the span of several years were compressed into a relatively short time and although eight-year-old Jaden portrayed Chris as a five-year-old, Gardner's son was just a toddler at the time. Towards the end, Chris Gardner has a brief uncredited cameo appearance before the credits.

Casting 
Chris Gardner initially thought Smith, an actor best known for his performances in blockbuster films, was miscast to play him. However, he claimed his daughter Jacintha said, "If [Smith] can play Muhammad Ali, he can play you!", referring to Smith's role in the biopic Ali (2001).

Music 
Varèse Sarabande released a soundtrack album with the score composed by Andrea Guerra on January 9, 2007.

Also in the film are brief portions of "Higher Ground" and "Jesus Children of America", both sung by Stevie Wonder, and "Lord, Don't Move the Mountain" by Mahalia Jackson and Doris Akers, sung by the Glide Ensemble.

Release

Box office 
The film debuted first at the North American box office, earning $27 million during its opening weekend and beating out heavily promoted films such as Eragon and Charlotte's Web. It was Smith's sixth consecutive #1 opening and one of Smith's consecutive $100 million blockbusters. 

The film grossed $163,566,459 domestically in the US and Canada. In the hope that Gardner's story would inspire the down-trodden citizens of Chattanooga, Tennessee, to achieve financial independence and to take greater responsibility for the welfare of their families, the mayor of Chattanooga organized a viewing of the film for the city's homeless. 

Gardner himself felt that it was imperative to share his story for the sake of its widespread social issues. "When I talk about alcoholism in the household, domestic violence, child abuse, illiteracy, and all of those issues—those are universal issues; those are not just confined to ZIP codes," he said.

Home media 
The film was released on DVD on March 27, 2007, and as of November 2007, ADCCA – RPC Region 1 DVD sales (U.S./Canada/Bermuda) accounted for an additional $89,923,088 in revenue, slightly less than half of what was earned in its first week of release. About 5,570,577 units have been sold, bringing in $90,582,602 in revenue.

Reception

Critical response 
The film was received generally positively by critics, with Will Smith receiving widespread acclaim for his performance. Film review site Rotten Tomatoes calculated a 67% overall approval based on 177 reviews, with an average rating of 6.40/10. The site's critical consensus reads, "Will Smith's heartfelt performance elevates The Pursuit of Happyness above mere melodrama." Metacritic assigned the film a weighted average score of 64 out of 100, based on 36 critics, indicating "generally favorable reviews".

In the San Francisco Chronicle, Mick LaSalle observed, "The great surprise of the picture is that it's not corny ... The beauty of the film is its honesty. In its outlines, it's nothing like the usual success story depicted on-screen, in which, after a reasonable interval of disappointment, success arrives wrapped in a ribbon and a bow. Instead, this success story follows the pattern most common in life—it chronicles a series of soul-sickening failures and defeats, missed opportunities, sure things that didn't quite happen, all of which are accompanied by a concomitant accretion of barely perceptible victories that gradually amount to something. In other words, it all feels real."

Manohla Dargis of The New York Times called the film "a fairy tale in realist drag ... the kind of entertainment that goes down smoothly until it gets stuck in your craw ... It's the same old bootstraps story, an American dream artfully told, skillfully sold. To that calculated end, the filmmaking is seamless, unadorned, transparent, the better to serve Mr. Smith's warm expressiveness ... How you respond to this man's moving story may depend on whether you find Mr. Smith's and his son's performances so overwhelmingly winning that you buy the idea that poverty is a function of bad luck and bad choices, and success the result of heroic toil and dreams."

Peter Travers of Rolling Stone awarded the film three out of a possible four stars and commented, "Smith is on the march toward Oscar ... [His] role needs gravity, smarts, charm, humor and a soul that's not synthetic. Smith brings it. He's the real deal."

In Variety, Brian Lowry said the film "is more inspirational than creatively inspired—imbued with the kind of uplifting, afterschool-special qualities that can trigger a major toothache ... Smith's heartfelt performance is easy to admire. But the movie's painfully earnest tone should skew its appeal to the portion of the audience that, admittedly, has catapulted many cloying TV movies into hits ... In the final accounting, [it] winds up being a little like the determined salesman Mr. Gardner himself: easy to root for, certainly, but not that much fun to spend time with."

Kevin Crust of the Los Angeles Times stated, "Dramatically it lacks the layering of a Kramer vs. Kramer, which it superficially resembles ... Though the subject matter is serious, the film itself is rather slight, and it relies on the actor to give it any energy. Even in a more modest register, Smith is a very appealing leading man, and he makes Gardner's plight compelling ... The Pursuit of Happyness is an unexceptional film with exceptional performances ... There are worse ways to spend the holidays, and, at the least, it will likely make you appreciate your own circumstances."

In the St. Petersburg Times, Steve Persall graded the film B- and added, "[It] is the obligatory feel-good drama of the holiday season and takes that responsibility a bit too seriously ... the film lays so many obstacles and solutions before its resilient hero that the volume of sentimentality and coincidence makes it feel suspect ... Neither Conrad's script nor Muccino's redundant direction shows [what] lifted the real-life Chris above better educated and more experienced candidates, but it comes through in the earnest performances of the two Smiths. Father Will seldom comes across this mature on screen; at the finale, he achieves a measure of Oscar-worthy emotion. Little Jaden is a chip off the old block, uncommonly at ease before the cameras. Their real-life bond is an inestimable asset to the on-screen characters' relationship, although Conrad never really tests it with any conflict."

National Review Online has named the film #7 in its list of 'The Best Conservative Movies'. Linda Chavez of the Center for Equal Opportunity wrote, "this film provides the perfect antidote to Wall Street and other Hollywood diatribes depicting the world of finance as filled with nothing but greed."

Accolades

See also 

 List of American films of 2006
 "Life, Liberty and the pursuit of Happiness"

References

External links 

 
 
 
 
 {{The pursuit of happyness writen Article At Hindimeinreview}

2006 films
2006 biographical drama films
2000s business films
African-American drama films
American biographical drama films
American business films
Biographical films about businesspeople
Columbia Pictures films
Escape Artists films
Films about father–son relationships
Films about children
Films about homelessness
Films about poverty in the United States
Films based on biographies
Films based on works by American writers
Films directed by Gabriele Muccino
Films produced by Will Smith
Films set in 1981
Films set in San Francisco
Films set in the San Francisco Bay Area
Films shot in San Francisco
Overbrook Entertainment films
Relativity Media films
Trading films
2000s English-language films
2000s American films
Films about salespeople